Nolosia is a monotypic moth genus in the subfamily Lymantriinae. Its only species, Nolosia marmorata, is found on Madagascar. Both the genus and the species were first described by George Hampson in 1900.

References

Lymantriinae
Monotypic moth genera